Caroline Bird Mahoney  (1915–2011) was an American feminist author.

Early life and education 
Born on April 15, 1915, in New York City, Caroline Bird became the youngest member of the Vassar College class of 1935 at the age of 16, but left after her junior year to marry; she later earned a Bachelor of Arts degree at the University of Toledo and a Master of Arts degree in comparative literature at the University of Wisconsin.

Career 
Her books include The Invisible Scar (1966), Everything a Women Needs to Know to Get Paid What She's Worth (1973), Case Against College (1975), The Crowding Syndrome: Learning to Live With Too Much and Too Many (1976), Enterprising Women (1976), What Women Want (1979), The Two-Paycheck Marriage (1979), Second Careers (1992), and Lives of Our Own (1995). Her book The Invisible Scar, about the Great Depression, was named by the American Library Association as one of the 100 most significant books of the year.

Caroline's 1968 book, Born Female: the High Cost of Keeping Women Down, grew out of an article on discrimination against women in business that was rejected by The Saturday Evening Post. Years later when Sofia Montenegro, an award-winning Nicaraguan journalist and prominent feminist activist, was asked how she became a revolutionary, she said that she would never forget the book that had changed her life; she was 16 years old when she read Born Female: the High Cost of Keeping Women Down.

According to the Oxford English Dictionary, the first time the term sexism appeared in print was in Bird's speech "On Being Born Female", which was delivered before the Episcopal Church Executive Council in Greenwich, Connecticut, and subsequently published on November 15, 1968, in Vital Speeches of the Day (p. 6).  In this speech she said in part: "There is recognition abroad that we are in many ways a sexist country. Sexism is judging people by their sex when sex doesn't matter. Sexism is intended to rhyme with racism. Women are sexists as often as men."

In 1977, Bird became an associate of the Women's Institute for Freedom of the Press (WIFP). WIFP is an American nonprofit publishing organization. The organization works to increase communication between women and connect the public with forms of women-based media.

Bird was a consultant to the National Commission on the Observance of International Women's Year in 1977 and was the chief writer of its report, The Spirit of Houston (1978).

In 1979, the Supersisters trading card set was produced and distributed; one of the cards featured Bird's name and picture.

She died on January 11, 2011, in Nashville, Tennessee. The Caroline Bird Papers, 1915–1995, are held at the Archives and Special Collections Library, Vassar College Libraries.

Personal life 
She married Edward A. Menuez in 1934 and they divorced in 1945; in 1957 she married J. Thomas Mahoney, who died in 1981.

References

1915 births
2011 deaths
20th-century American Episcopalians
20th-century American non-fiction writers
20th-century American women writers
American feminists
University of Toledo alumni
University of Wisconsin–Madison College of Letters and Science alumni
21st-century American women
American feminist writers